Farmersville High School may refer to:

Farmersville High School (California), in Farmersville, California
Farmersville High School (Texas), in Farmersville, Texas